The women's pole vault at the 2018 IAAF World U20 Championships was held at Ratina Stadium on 10 and 12 July.

Records

Results

Qualification
The qualification round took place on 10 July, in two groups, both starting at 16:23. Athletes attaining a mark of at least 4.25 metres ( Q ) or at least the 12 best performers ( q ) qualified for the final.

Final
The final was held on 12 July at 18:20.

References

pole vault
Pole vault at the World Athletics U20 Championships